Cedar Party Creek, a perennial stream of the Manning River catchment, is located in the Mid North Coast region of New South Wales, Australia.

Course and features

The Manning River eventually flows into the Tasman Sea through a minor delta east of Taree.

See also

 List of rivers of Australia
 List of rivers in New South Wales (A-K)
 Rivers of New South Wales

References

External links
 

 

Rivers of New South Wales
Rivers of the Hunter Region
Mid North Coast
Mid-Coast Council